Máté Katona (born 22 June 1997) is a professional Hungarian footballer who plays as a midfielder for Kecskemét on loan from Ferencváros.

Club career
On 15 February 2022, Katona returned to Soroksár SC on loan for the rest of the season after playing there from August to December 2021 on a previous loan. In July 2022, Katona moved on a new loan to Kecskemét.

Club statistics

Updated to games played as of 15 May 2022.

References

External links
 HLSZ 
 

1997 births
People from Sopron
Sportspeople from Győr-Moson-Sopron County
Living people
Hungarian footballers
Hungary youth international footballers
Hungary under-21 international footballers
Association football defenders
MTK Budapest FC players
Ferencvárosi TC footballers
Soroksár SC players
Kecskeméti TE players
Nemzeti Bajnokság I players
Nemzeti Bajnokság II players